David Bannerman may refer to:

David Armitage Bannerman (1886–1979), British ornithologist
David Campbell Bannerman (born 1960), British politician
David Bannerman (bishop), South African Anglican bishop
Sir David Bannerman, 15th Baronet (born 1935), of the Bannerman baronets

See also
Bannerman (disambiguation)
Clan Bannerman